American Chronicles is a documentary television program that was broadcast by Fox Broadcasting Company as part of its 1990 fall lineup.

American Chronicles was produced by Mark Frost through Lynch/Frost Productions, the company that he founded with David Lynch. Featured many of the same quirky camera angles, unusual music, and a focus on violence and sexuality that were hallmarks of their ABC series Twin Peaks.  The half-hour weekly program was narrated by Richard Dreyfuss.

This program had a relatively brief run, being cancelled just over three months after its premiere, after ranking last out of 98 shows with an average household rating of 3.07.

Episodes 
 101: Farewell to the Flesh (pilot episode; writer/director: Mark Frost; airdate: 9/8/1990)
 102: The Eye of the Beholder (airdate: 9/15/1990)
 103: Manhattan After Dark (writer/producer: Robin L. Sestero; airdate: 9/22/1990)
 104: Auto-Obsession (airdate: 9/29/1990)
 105: Biker Nation (writer/producer: Ruben Norte; airdate: 10/6/1990)
 106: Semper Fidelis (writer/producer: Robin L. Sestero; airdate: 10/13/1990)
 107: This Gun's for Hire / Defender of the Faith (writer/producer: Chappy Hardy; airdate: 10/27/1990)
 108: After a Fashion / An American Camelot (airdate: 11/3/1990)
 109: Here Today, Gone Tomorrow / Truck Stop (writer/producer: Robin L. Sestero; airdate: 10/6/1990)
 110: Once Upon a Time (about Hugh Hefner) (writers: Gary H. Grossman, Michael Gross, Robert Heath; directed by Robert Heath; airdate: 11/17/1990)
 111: The Class of '65 (airdate: 12/8/1990)
 112: Diamonds Are Forever (Last Day at Comiskey Park) / The Future That Never Was (writer/producer: David H. Jones; airdate: 12/15/1990)
 113: Champions (unaired in U.S.; first aired in UK 6/21/92)

International broadcasts 
American Chronicles was aired in the United Kingdom by Channel 4 (1992), in Australia by SBS (1993), in New Zealand by TV3 (1992), in France by Planète (1992) and in Spain by TVE (1992).

References 
Brooks, Tim and Marsh, Earle. The Complete Directory to Prime Time Network and Cable TV Shows.
Miller, Craig and Thorne, John (eds.). Wrapped in Plastic, Vol. 1, No. 9, p. 9-13. Win-Mill Productions, February 1994.
Miller, Craig and Thorne, John (eds.). Wrapped in Plastic, Vol. 1, No. 13, p. 30. Win-Mill Productions, October 1994.
Weinstein, Steve. The Lynch / Frost View of America. Los Angeles Times, July 29, 1990.
Rochlin, Margy. The Unblinking Eye: David Lynch and Mark Frost Chronicle America. Documentary Magazine, October 1, 1990.

External links 
 
 American Chronicles at TV Guide
 American Chronicles at TV Tango
 American Chronicles at Hollywood.com

1990s American documentary television series
1990 American television series debuts
1991 American television series endings
Fox Broadcasting Company original programming
Television series by CBS Studios
American culture
Works by David Lynch
Television series created by Mark Frost